Earl Coleman (August 12, 1925 – July 12, 1995) was a jazz singer.

Coleman was born in Port Huron, Michigan. As a child, he lived with his mother, grandmother, aunt, and step-grandfather.

After moving to Indianapolis in 1939, he sang with Ernie Fields and Bardu Ali. He joined the Jay McShann band in 1943 and later sang with Earl Hines, the Billy Eckstine Orchestra, and King Kolax. He then went with McShann to California and recorded with Charlie Parker, Fats Navarro, and Max Roach in 1948. In 1954, he worked with Gene Ammons and recorded with Art Farmer and Gigi Gryce. In 1956 he was with Sonny Rollins.

By 1960 he was recording as a leader and performed with Gerald Wilson. In 1962 he was with Don Byas in Paris and in the mid-60s with Billy Taylor and Frank Foster. By 1980–86 he was recording with organist Shirley Scott.

Coleman died of cardiac arrest in New York City, aged 69.

Discography

As leader
 Earl Coleman Returns (Prestige, 1956)
 Love Songs (Atlantic, 1968)
 A Song for You (Xanadu, 1978)
 There's Something About an Old Love (Xanadu, 1983)
 Stardust (Stash, 1984)

As sideman
With Etta Jones
 Sugar (Muse, 1989)

With Sonny Rollins
 Tour de Force (Prestige, 1956)

With  Charlie Parker
 Singing Dark Shadows on The Charlie Parker Quartet (Dial 1014, 1948)

References

American jazz singers
American rhythm and blues singers
1925 births
1995 deaths
20th-century American singers